Pippenalia is a genus of Mexican plants in the groundsel tribe within the sunflower family.

The genus is named in honor of botanist Richard Wayne Pippen.

Species
The only known species is Pippenalia delphiniifolia, native to Mexico (Chihuahua, Zacatecas, Aguascalientes, Jalisco, Durango).

References

Monotypic Asteraceae genera
Endemic flora of Mexico
Senecioneae